Amposta is the capital of the comarca of Montsià, in the province of Tarragona, Catalonia, Spain, 190 km south of Barcelona on the Mediterranean Coast. It is located at 8 metres above sea level, on the Ebre river, not far from its mouth. Its population was 20,606 in 2018.

The GR 92 long distance footpath, which roughly follows the length of the Mediterranean coast of Spain, has a staging point at Amposta.

References

External links
 Ajuntament d'Amposta
 Government data pages 

Municipalities in Montsià
Populated places in Montsià